The 2019–20 Continental Cup was the 23rd edition of the IIHF Continental Cup, Europe's second-tier ice hockey club competition organised by International Ice Hockey Federation. The season started on 20 September 2019 and the final tournament was played from 10 to 12 January 2020.

Qualified teams

First round

Group A
The Group A tournament was played in Istanbul, Turkey, from 20 to 22 September 2019.

All times are local (UTC+3).

Group B
The Group B tournament was played in Mechelen, Belgium, from 20 to 22 September 2019.

All times are local (UTC+2).

Second round

Group C
The Group C tournament was played in Brovary, Ukraine, from 18 to 20 October 2019.

All times are local (UTC+3).

Group D
The Group D tournament was played in Ritten, Italy, from 18 to 20 October 2019.

All times are local (UTC+2).

Third round

Group E
The Group E tournament was played in Vojens, Denmark, from 15 to 17 November 2019.

All times are local (UTC+1).

Group F
The Group F tournament was played in Kraków, Poland, from 15 to 17 November 2019.

All times are local (UTC+1).

Final round
Continental Cup Final tournament was played in Vojens, Denmark, from 10 to 12 January 2020.

All times are local (UTC+1).

See also
 2019–20 Champions Hockey League

References

IIHF Continental Cup
2019–20 in European ice hockey